Doodh peeti was a method of female infanticide in which newborn girls were drowned in pails or pits  of cow milk (doodh). It is the British government who found that in Rajasthan, the people were dipping and drowning newborn girl child in milk to death. The practice was prevalent in the Saurashtra and Kutch region of India. The phrase is a euphemism literally meaning "feeding of milk".

History
During a census in 1805, the British officials found almost no girls in Jadeja Rajput families of the Kutch and Kathiawar regions. The 11th edition of Encyclopædia Britannica (1910) noted under the topic Infanticide that this method was practiced by some Rajputs to avoid paying dowry later. The British resident in Baroda, Colonel Walker, insisted on banning the practice while signing pacts with the local Rajputs. The practice however continued until the late 19th century.

See also
 Kuri-mar
 Female infanticide in India

References

Sex selection in India
Violence against women in India